Thonedauntaing is a village in the Wundwin Township, Mandalay Division of central  Myanmar.

References

Populated places in Mandalay District